Barnert may refer to:

Nathan Barnert
The Barnert Hospital (or the Barnert Medical Arts Complex on the grounds of the former hospital)
The Miriam Barnert Hebrew Free School
The Barnert Temple in Franklin Lakes, NJ